Alejandro Manuel Sinibaldi Castro (1825–1896) was acting President of Guatemala from April 2, 1885, to April 5, 1885.

Biography 

Of partial Italian descent, he was a rich businessman who Was "First Designate to the Presidency", the equivalent of Vice-President in the time of Justo Rufino Barrios.  When  Barrios was killed on April 2, 1885, in El Salvador, Sinibaldi Castro became acting president.  However, given that Sinibaldi Castro had no political connections and was not in the military, he was pressured to resign within days of taking over.  His successor was general Manuel Lisandro Barillas, who served as acting president but never called for elections in the stipulated time, and when he eventually did, he was elected as Constitutional President.

Image gallery

See also 
 Justo Rufino Barrios
 Manuel Lisandro Barillas

References

Bibliography

Notes 

1825 births
1896 deaths
Guatemalan people of Italian descent
Liberal Party (Guatemala) politicians
Presidents of Guatemala
Vice presidents of Guatemala
19th-century Guatemalan people